Matthew Blake (born May 14, 1985) is an American professional baseball coach. He is the pitching coach for the New York Yankees of Major League Baseball (MLB).

Career
Blake attended Concord High School in Concord, New Hampshire. Blake was a three sport athlete. He excelled in golf, basketball, and baseball. Blake attended the College of the Holy Cross, and played college baseball all four years for the Crusaders. Blake graduated from Holy Cross with degrees in psychology and philosophy.

Blake started his baseball coaching career in 2009 as the pitching coach for Lincoln-Sudbury Regional High School in Sudbury, Massachusetts, and as a pitching coordinator for Cressey Sports Performance in Hudson, Massachusetts. Blake began his career in professional baseball in 2010 as an associate scout for the New York Yankees. He served as the pitching coach for the Yarmouth–Dennis Red Sox of the Cape Cod League during the 2015 season. He joined the Cleveland Indians organization in 2015 as a lower level pitching coordinator, and later was promoted to assistant director of pitching development in 2016.

The New York Yankees hired Blake as their pitching coach on November 7, 2019. After the 2022 season, Blake signed a new three-year contract with the Yankees.

References

External links
Holy Cross Crusaders bio

Living people
Baseball coaches from New Hampshire
Baseball players from New Hampshire
Baseball pitchers
Major League Baseball pitching coaches
New York Yankees coaches
New York Yankees scouts
Holy Cross Crusaders baseball players
College of the Holy Cross alumni
Cape Cod Baseball League coaches
Minor league baseball coaches
1985 births